Molly Scott may refer to:

 Molly Scott Cato, British politician
 Molly Scott (athlete), Irish track and field athlete
 Molly Scott (actress), American actress

 Molly Scott (singer)